Ichthyococcus intermedius, also known as Intermediate lightfish, is a species of the genus Ichthyococcus.

References

Ichthyococcus
Fish described in 1980